Aston cum Aughton is a civil parish in the Metropolitan Borough of Rotherham, South Yorkshire, England.  The parish contains 25 listed buildings that are recorded in the National Heritage List for England.  Of these, one is listed at Grade I, the highest of the three grades, one is at Grade II*, the middle grade, and the others are at Grade II, the lowest grade.  The parish contains the villages of Aston, Aughton and Swallownest and the surrounding countryside.  Most of the listed buildings are houses and associated structures, farmhouses and farm buildings.  The other listed buildings include a church, associated gate piers and a gravestone, a former school used as a reading room, and two mileposts.


Key

Buildings

References

Citations

Sources

 

Lists of listed buildings in South Yorkshire
Buildings and structures in the Metropolitan Borough of Rotherham